Moore's woolly lemur (Avahi mooreorum), or the Masoala woolly lemur, is a woolly lemur endemic to Madagascar.  It has brown-grey fur and a reddish tail. It is named in honor of the Gordon and Betty Moore Foundation of San Francisco.

References

Mammals described in 2008
Woolly lemurs